La Institución Libre de Enseñanza (ILE, English: The Free Institution of Education), was an educational project developed in Spain for over half a century (1876–1936). The institute was inspired by the philosophy of Krausism, first introduced to the Complutense University of Madrid by Julián Sanz del Río, and which, despite being subsequently ejected from that university, was to have a significant impact on intellectual life in Restoration Spain.

The institution was founded in 1876 by a group of disaffected university professors, including Francisco Giner de los Ríos, Gumersindo Azcarate, Teodoro Sainz Rueda and Nicolás Salmerón, who distanced themselves from the main university campus in Madrid to achieve academic freedom. They declined to adjust their teaching to any official religious dogma or the moral and political imposition of the time. Consequently, they had to continue their educational work outside the state sector by creating a secular private educational institution, starting with university level instruction and later extending their activities to primary and secondary education.

They supported and seconded the intellectual ideas of Joaquín Costa, Leopoldo Alas (Clarín), Ramon Perez de Ayala, José Ortega y Gasset, Gregorio Marañón, Ramón Menéndez Pidal, Antonio Machado, Joaquín Sorolla, Augusto González Linares, Santiago Ramón y Cajal and Federico Rubio, among others involved in educational, cultural and social renewal.

History

Following the implementation of the political model of Antonio Cánovas del Castillo, who wanted to secure a fundamentalist nation as ordained by the divine will, an 1875 "Royal Decree" issued by education minister Manuel Orovio Echagüe severely limited academic freedom in Spain "if it went against the tenets of faith", meaning the contemporary conservative Roman Catholicism in Spain.

In 1881, some professors migrated to the independent ILE. They trained Manuel Bartolomé Cossío, who succeeded Giner in leading the institution, as well as Ricardo Rubio, Pedro Blanco Suárez, Angel do Rego, Joseph Ontañón Arias and Pedro Jiménez-Landi.
The ILE lasted until the Spanish Civil War in 1936, following which all such progressive education was destroyed by the conservative Spanish State.

The list of contributors to The Bulletin of the Free Institution of Education included Bertrand Russell, Henri Bergson, Charles Darwin, John Dewey, Santiago Ramón y Cajal, Miguel de Unamuno, Montessori, Leo Tolstoy, H. G. Wells, Rabindranath Tagore, Juan Ramón Jiménez, Gabriela Mistral, Benito Perez Galdos, Emilia Pardo Bazán, Azorin, Eugenio d'Ors and Ramón Pérez de Ayala. Contributors closely linked to the institution included Julián Sanz del Río, Demófilo and children Antonio Machado and Manuel Machado, Julio Rey Pastor, Constancio Bernaldo de Quirós, Luis Simarro, Nicholas Achúcarro, Francisco Barnes Salinas and Portuguese Alice Pestana.

The ILE began to critically investigate the Spanish past, and from it emerged the  Center for Historical Studies led by the founder of the Spanish philological school, Ramón Menéndez Pidal. The ILE also created contact centers for artistic and scientific elites with the European avant-garde movement, notably the Residencia de estudiantes led by Alberto Jiménez Fraud and the Junta para la Ampliación de Estudios (Board for Advanced Studies and Scientific Research), organized by José Castillejo.

The poetical movement the Generation of '27 was, in a way, an emanation of the ILE intended to attain Spanish cultural and scientific harmony with Europe shortly before modernization was halted by the Spanish Civil War, after which all progressive educational assets were confiscated and its proponents forced into exile by Francoist Spain. Those who remained faced censorship, persecution and ridicule, as it was considered unpatriotic by their detractors. Abroad, exiles dispersed throughout Europe and Latin America, moving to different countries and thus cross-fertilizing the cultural and progressive ideas throughout the Western world.

Following the Spanish transition to democracy in 1978, when the legal process of recovering the legacy of the institution began, ILE funds have been managed by the Fundación Francisco Giner de los Ríos created for that purpose.

Associated people

First phase
The early members of the ILE were mainly men who gathered around Giner after his return to the university in 1881 following his 1875 expulsion. They included Manuel Bartolomé Cossío, Joaquín Costa, Leopoldo Alas (Clarín), Alfredo Calderon, Eduardo Soler, Messia Jacinto Adolfo Posada, Pedro Dorado Montero, Aniceto Sela and Rafael Altamira.

Second phase
Giner called the acolytes of the ILE his "children". These included Julian Besteiro, Pedro Corominas, José Manuel Pedregal, Martin Navarro Flores, Constancio Bernaldo Quiros, Manuel and Antonio Machado, Domingo Barnés, José Castillejo, Gonzalo Jimenez de la Espada, Luis de Zulueta and Fernando de los Rios.

Third phase
Those born between 1880 and 1890, are recognized as the "grandchildren" of Giner; noted pupils included José Pijoán, Juan Ramón Jiménez, Francisco Ribera Pastor, José Ortega y Gasset, Américo Castro, Gregorio Marañón Manuel García Morente, Lorenzo Luzuriaga, Paul Azcarate and Alberto Jiménez Fraud.

Headquarters
The 200 founding shareholders abandoned the first proposed ILE headquarters in the Paseo de la Castellana, since occupied by the Military School, and instead rented an apartment in Calle Esparteros No. 9, (currently renumbered as No. 11), and subsequently relocated to Infantas No. 42 before moving again to Paseo del Oblisco No. 8 (since 1914 known as Paseo del General Martínez Campos No. 14 and No. 16).

The building block included a garden, in what was then the outskirts of Madrid, and was better suited to the educational concept of the institution. In 1908 the site was further developed with the construction of the "Pavilion Giner" and "Soler Hall."

During the Spanish Civil War the building was heavily damaged and looted, and even underwent a symbolic destruction of trees by a group of Falangists (only a century-old acacia and privet were saved). In 1940 the site was seized and attached to the Ministry of Education, refitted (1942) and reopened (1945) as School Group Joaquin Sorolla (close to the present Sorolla Museum). After 1955 its premises were used as headquarters of the School Food Service.

After the Transition, the facility was briefly opened as the Eduardo Marquina National College (1980–1985); but was finally allocated to the Free Institution of Education in 1982. Recent renovations have provided the ILE with state-of-the-art buildings.

Influences
The influence of the ILE was instrumental in getting the transitional Spanish government to undertake a series of legal, educational and social reforms. Agencies such as the National Pedagogical Museum and the Board for Advanced Scientific Studies and Research were created to send students to study on scholarship abroad.

The Center for Historical Studies, together with the National Institute of Physics and Natural Science and the Residencia de Estudiantes, established in Calle Pinar, Madrid, became hotbeds of writers and artists in which Albert Einstein gave lectures in Spain in 1923.

Attempts at educational reform crystallized between 1907 and 1936 via pioneering initiatives such as the School Institute, school holiday camps, the International Summer School at the University of Santander and various projects during the Second Spanish Republic that disseminated education and culture in remote settlements throughout Spain.

About a year after his death in 1915, followers of Francisco Giner de los Ríos established a foundation bearing his name to ensure the continuity of the ILE and pursue its educational objectives. The Foundation published the Complete Works of Francisco Giner between 1916 and 1936.

There are still schools that are linked to the current Foundation Giner de los Ríos, and continue to provide, with certain variations, the educational model of the ILE like the Colegio Estudio, founded in 1940 by Jimena Menéndez Pidal, Angels Gasset and Carmen Garcia del Diestro, which educated Spanish intellectuals and politicians. Later similar private institutions emerged, like Colegio Base and Colegio Estilo, founded in 1959 by Spanish writer Josefina Aldecoa.

Fingoy projects
One of the more curious effects of the ILE is the College Fingoy in the city of Lugo, which was founded in the teeth of Falangist opposition in 1950 by Antonio Fernández López, a businessman and philanthropist of Galicia, with the intention to develop the ideas of the ILE in Franco's Spain.

Fernández López had experienced the Residencia de estudantes sponsored by The Board of Advanced Studies in Madrid during the 1920s and 1930s. Returning to his native Galicia, he decided to promote a study center with the same principles in Lugo for the education of his 12 children and his siblings Manuel and Conchita.

College Fingoy was only the second mixed (boys and girls) school to be opened in Franco's Spain and the agriculture classes, theater, music and dance were held in the Galician language. During the early years it was led by Ricardo Carballo Calero, a university professor and Galician intellectual who was victimized by the Franco regime.

College Fingoy also featured class intellectuals and Galician artists such as the poet Xosé Luís Méndez Ferrín, former President of the Royal Galician Academy, Bernardino Grana and painter Pacios. Fernández López also created the Center for Studies and the Barreiros Farm, governed by the same ILE principles.

See also
Escuela Moderna
Generation of '98
Noucentisme
Regenerationism

References

Further reading
 VV. AA., La Institución Libre de Enseñanza y Giner de los Ríos: nuevas perspectivas, ACE / Fundación Francisco Giner de los Ríos, Madrid, 2013, tres tomos.
 Antonio Jiménez-Landi, La Institución Libre de Enseñanza y su ambiente. Universidad Complutense, 1996, cuatro tomos.  (Por esta obra Jiménez-Landi recibió el Premio Nacional de Historia en 1997).
 Antonio Jiménez-Landi, Breve historia de la Institución Libre de Enseñanza (1896–1939). Tébar, 2010. 
 Antonio Jiménez-Landi, Manuel Bartolomé Cossío, una vida ejemplar: (1857–1935), Instituto de Cultura Juan-Gil Albert, Alicante, 1989.

External links

 La Institución Libre de Enseñanza
 Fundación Francisco Giner de los Ríos
 Archivo virtual de la Edad de Plata (1868–1936)
 El sueño krausista y la Institución Libre de Enseñanza

Politics of Spain
Educational organisations based in Spain
Alternative education
Philosophy of education